Hooray for Diffendoofer Day! is a children's book credited to Dr. Seuss "with some help from Jack Prelutsky and Lane Smith". The book is based on verses and sketches created by Seuss before his death in 1991, and was expanded to book length and completed by poet Prelutsky and illustrator Smith for publication in 1998.

Plot
The story surrounds the Diffendoofer School in the town of Dinkerville, which is well liked by its students, particularly the unnamed narrator, notably because of its many eccentric faculty members, especially Miss Bonkers, the narrator's teacher. However, the students must make a good grade on a standardized test (which turns out in the end to be a revising test on multiple subjects they regularly learn) lest Diffendoofer be demolished and they be sent to an adjacent school in Flobbertown, which requires uniforms to be worn and is incredibly dull.

1998 children's books
Books by Dr. Seuss
American picture books
Books published posthumously
Random House books
Schools in fiction